Passionate Summer is a 1958 British drama film directed by Rudolph Cartier and starring Virginia McKenna, Bill Travers and Yvonne Mitchell. It is also known by the alternative title Storm Over Jamaica. It was based on a best-selling 1949 novel by Richard Mason called The Shadow and the Peak.

Premise
A British schoolteacher moves to Jamaica to teach after a tumultuous divorce, and meets an exciting new woman.

Cast
 Virginia McKenna - Judy Waring
 Bill Travers - Douglas Lockwood
 Yvonne Mitchell - Mrs Pawley
 Alexander Knox - Leonard Pawley
 Carl Möhner - Louis
 Gordon Heath - Coroner
 Guy Middleton - Duffield
 Pearl Prescod - Mrs Morgan
 Ellen Barrie - Sylvia

Development
The film was based on Richard Mason's novel The Shadow and the Peak which was published in 1949. It was Mason's second novel, following The Wind Cannot Read, which the Rank Organisation had filmed with Dirk Bogarde. The New York Times called The Shadow and the Peake "diverting, it is humorous, it contains the necessary serious undertones."

In March 1950 it was announced that Alec Guinness was weighing up whether to appear in The Mudlark at 20th Century Fox or The Shadow and the Peak from J. Arthur Rank. Robert Hamer was to write and direct.

Guinness elected to make The Mudlark and there were reportedly issues getting the script approved by the censor. In December 1951 Hamer said producer Michael Truman would be going to the US in January to negotiate changes to the script with the Breen Office (the US censor). Hamer was to make the movie for Ealing and he wanted to star Vivien Leigh. Michael Balcon reportedly gave his approval, then changed his mind, worried about the film's erotic content. This led to Hamer leaving Ealing.

In December 1957 it was reported that film rights were owned by Kenneth Harper, who had offered the lead to Van Johnson, who had just made Action of the Tiger with Harper.

Production
In March 1958 it was announced the film would be made in Jamaica and at Pinewood Studios under the title of Passionate Summer starring Virginia McKenna, Bill Travers and Yvonne Mitchell. McKenna was coming off two large hits, A Town Like Alice and Carve Her Name with Pride. She and Bill Travers had married in real life in 1957. Filming began on 28 April 1958 shortly after production had started on another Mason adaptation, The Wind Cannot Read. 

McKenna was pregnant during filming and it would be the last film she made for Rank (although she turned down a movie they wanted her to do afterwards).

Director Rudolph Cartier was under contract to the BBC but was released to Rank to make the film.

According to Bill Travers:
Neither of us [his wife Virginia McKenna] cared very much for Passionate Summer. Cartier was already an important person in television — that was how he got Passionate Summer — but I’m not sure that he translated well to the big screen. He did a lot of rehearsal, and, by this time, I’d begun to shed the idea of doing a tremendous amount of rehearsal. By then, I wanted to make things more natural and I found that Cartier was too bound by what had happened at rehearsal. I think the film needed something much more impressionistic than Cartier’s direction. It needed to be made like a French film. [ also think that it was as a result of that film that Ginny and I became less than favourites with the Rank Organisation.

Reception
Variety called it "the sort of glossy novelettish yarn that will do nothing for the reputation of the British film industry."

The Monthly Film Bulletin said "any forebodings roused by the story outline of this film are thorough fulfilled."

In the US, Passionate Summer was the name given to a French film starring Raf Vallone that came out in 1957. So the film was retitled in America as Storm Over Jamaica.

Film academic Philip Kemp wrote the film "was scripted (flatly) by Joan Henry, directed (turgidly) by Rudolph Cartier and acted (stolidly) by Bill Travers and Virginia McKenna. If [Robert] Hamer hadn't long since been driven to drink, this film would have been enough to do it."

Box Office
The film was a box office failure. Travers later said that because of this he and McKenna became "less than favourites with the Rank Organisation."

References

External links

Passionate Summer at BFI

1958 films
1958 drama films
Films shot in Jamaica
Films shot at Pinewood Studios
British drama films
Films scored by Angelo Francesco Lavagnino
Films directed by Rudolph Cartier
1950s English-language films
1950s British films